The Yellow Ribbon is a resistance movement in the occupied territories of Ukraine, created in April 2022 after the Russian military invasion. The goal of the movement is informational resistance against the Russian occupiers.

History

April–June 
In April 2022, the "Yellow Ribbon" public resistance movement emerged in the territories occupied by Russia. On 25 April, on the Telegram channel, the coordinators of the movement called on residents to hang Ukrainian flags and yellow ribbons on the streets and in crowded places. On the same day, yellow ribbons appeared in occupied Kherson.

On 27 April, "Yellow Ribbon" held a peaceful action called "Kherson is Ukraine" in Kherson. About 500 people took to the streets of the city; four of them were injured. According to the organizers, the rally became an impetus for the development of the movement. Subsequently, yellow ribbons began to appear in Oleshky, Melitopol, Nova Kakhovka, Berdiansk, Yalta, Simferopol, Kerch, Saky, Donetsk, Luhansk, Henichesk, Alushta, and other cities and villages in the occupied territories.

On 17 June, the movement held an online rally in support of Kherson on Instagram. The campaign gathered 36,000 people, 75,000 likes, and almost 20,000 shares.

July 
On 4 July, the start of the "Stop the Referendum" open-ended campaign was announced. The goal is to disrupt the maximum number of referendums in the occupied territories. The next day, leaflets against referendums appeared in Kherson, Donetsk, Melitopol, Luhansk, and Berdiansk.

On 7 July, "Yellow Ribbon" announced the start of the open-ended campaign "Crimea - time to go home". The organizers called on Crimean activists to report data on the movement of Russian troops to the YeVorog Telegram bot, hang yellow ribbons, and send patriotic postcards saying "Crimea is Ukraine. Not only since 1954. But always!", "08/24/2022. Crimea is ready" and "Time to fight! Time to resist! Time to go home".
On 13 July, the resistance movement called on the residents of Donetsk and Luhansk regions to block the referendum, hang yellow ribbons, and transmit information about the movement of enemy troops and collaborators to the "eVorog" platform. In addition, activists in Donbas were urged to post leaflets saying "24.08.2022. Donetsk is ready" and "24.08.2022. Luhansk is ready".

On 26 July, the letter "Ї" became the new symbol of the movement. Coordinators were urged to mark buildings where the so-called "referendum" can take place:On the same day, the letter began to appear in the form of graffiti in the so-called "precincts". In addition, "Ї" soon became one of the symbols of the resistance of Ukrainians in the temporarily occupied territories.

On 30 July, "Yellow Ribbon" began offering a monetary reward for information about the activities of the occupiers. The next day, the movement called for information as a reward about the locations where the Russian invaders rest—restaurants and cafes.

August
On 3 August, in partnership with the Mariupol City Council, the "Yellow Ribbon" movement launched an online rally, "Mariupol is Ukraine" on Instagram.The action lasted until 22 August.

On 5 August, the movement published "love letters" — warm lines from Ukrainians with words of support for the residents of the temporarily occupied territories.

On 6 August, "Yellow Ribbon" launched the newspaper "Voice of the Partisan". The first edition consisted of 1,200 copies and was posted around Kherson. On 8 August, the newspaper began to be published in the Crimea.

On 7 August, the movement offered a reward of 10 bitcoins, or 230,000 US dollars for the arrest of Russian Crimean leader Sergey Aksyonov and information about his exact location.

In August, the campaign "Stop Referendum" became widespread. Leaflets with calls to boycott referendums and not take Russian passports began to be actively distributed in temporarily occupied settlements.

On 23 August, a new open-ended flash mob called "Stop Rashism" was launched. The goal is to rip off and damage Russian leaflets, announcements, and symbols of the occupiers in the temporarily occupied territories.

On the same day in Kyiv, at the street exhibition "Infoprotiv", initiated by the "Chesno" movement in cooperation with the National Museum of the Revolution of Dignity, one of the boards was dedicated, among other things, to the activities of the "Yellow Ribbon".

On 24 August, on the Independence Day of Ukraine, Ukrainian Railways launched the "Train to Victory" - 7 cars painted by Ukrainian artists. Each car is dedicated to a region of Ukraine and the exploits of people resisting the Russian occupiers. One of the cars is dedicated to the "Yellow Ribbon" movement.

On 31 August, "Yellow Ribbon" called on residents of occupied territories not to participate in the telephone surveys. The coordinators of the movement noted that this is one of the schemes of the occupiers to at least somehow hold a referendum:In such cases, the movement advised people not to pick up the phone and cancel the call. They also noted that there is no need to communicate with these people because the very fact of communication can be interpreted by them as a positive response to the referendum.

September
In September, yellow ribbons, patriotic posters, and graffiti continued to appear on the streets of the cities of the temporarily occupied territories. In particular, from September 8 to 10, during the counteroffensive in the Kharkiv region of the Armed Forces of Ukraine, the movement intensified in the temporarily occupied Vovchansk. Already on September 11, the city was liberated from the Russian invaders.

On September 14, in temporarily occupied Kherson, Nova Kakhovka, Skadovsk, Kyrylivka, Tokmak, and Ivanovka, "Yellow Ribbon" held an action to collect signatures in support of the Armed Forces of Ukraine. For the safety of residents, activists asked to use an alternative signature. In a few hours, there were collected about 1,000 signatures.

On September 17, the movement called on residents of the temporarily occupied territories to send photos and videos of Russian collaborators, equipment, and campaign products, as well as streets, administrative buildings, and banks.

On September 19, during another posting of leaflets in the temporarily occupied Simferopol, the movement pasted leaflets with the inscriptions "Opening soon!" and "Crimea is Ukraine!" on the building of Presidential representative of Ukraine in Crimea.

On September 20, "Yellow Ribbon" responded to the statements of the occupiers about holding pseudo-referendums in the temporarily occupied territories:

Activists assured that "referendums will not change Ukraine" and published an article in which they explained why their holding will not change anything.

On September 21, during the preparations of the occupiers for the holding of the so-called "referendums", the movement called on the public to disrupt them by all means: to mark with the letter "Ї" the buildings in which the "referendums" can be held, as well as to give the  information about their holding and the participants (lists, names, photo, video, etc).

On September 23, "Yellow Ribbon" together with the Ukrainian IT community began recording the participants of pseudo-referendums. On the same day, activists published data on the locations of the so-called "referendums", as well as personal data of the "chairmen of election commissions" in the Kherson, Luhansk, and Zaporizhzhia oblasts. In addition, the movement called on the residents of the temporarily occupied territories to completely ignore the pseudo-referendums and in no case open the door to strangers.

October–January
On October 19, the "Yellow Ribbon" movement, together with other fighters for Ukrainian integrity, received the Andrii Sakharov Prize from the European Parliament for "For Freedom of Thought" - the main award of the European Union in the field of human rights.

In November, after the liberation of Kherson by the Armed Forces of Ukraine, "Yellow Ribbon" on the Telegram channel declassified the names of some Kherson activists in the movement that resisted the Russian occupation. Subsequently, the movement continued its activities in other temporarily occupied territories.

On November 21, the Day of Dignity and Freedom of Ukraine, the movement organized a flash mob "#ЖовтаСтрічка" ("#ZhovtaStrichka") on social networks. Participants were encouraged to tie a yellow ribbon and publish a post with the corresponding hashtag. Ukrainians and foreigners from all over the world joined the action, in particular, a considerable number of politicians, musicians, sportsmen, and scientists tied yellow ribbons. In addition, the symbol of public resistance appeared at the Mission of Ukraine to the European Union in Brussels and at the Ukrainian Antarctic station Vernadsky Research Base.

In the first week of 2023, "Yellow Ribbon" distributed more than 500 patriotic leaflets on the territory of the temporarily occupied Crimea. Activists also called on residents of the temporarily occupied territories to join the movement, print and distribute posters, as well as send photos of the activities of the movement chatbot  on Telegram.

Symbolism 
In an interview with the online publication "NV", representatives of the movement talked about the meaning of the yellow ribbon:

See also 
 Ukrainian resistance during the 2022 Russian invasion of Ukraine
 2022 protests in Russian-occupied Ukraine
 Popular Resistance of Ukraine
 Berdiansk Partisan Army

References 

Russian occupation of Ukraine
Resistance during the 2022 Russian invasion of Ukraine
Social movements
Guerrilla organizations